The Siriul Mare is a right tributary of the river Buzău in Romania. It discharges into the Siriu Reservoir, which is drained by the Buzău, near Gura Siriului.

Tributaries

The following rivers are tributaries of the Siriul Mare (from source to mouth):

Left: Vâna Mălâei, Milea, Mreaja

Right: Morcovoaia, Siriul Mic, Roșia Mare, Molidu, Monteoru, Valea Popii, Vaca Mare, Vaca Mică

References

Rivers of Romania
Rivers of Buzău County